Christopher Alexander Kofi Dickson (born 28 December 1984) is a former Ghanaian international footballer who plays as a striker for Hornchurch.

Club career
Dickson started his career at Erith & Belvedere before moving to Dulwich Hamlet in the summer of 2006. He scored 31 goals in 36 games for Dulwich in the 2006–07 season.

Dickson signed for Charlton Athletic on 12 March 2007 from Dulwich Hamlet for £35,000, signing a two-and-a-half-year deal after scoring twice in a reserve-team game for Charlton. As he was signed outside the transfer window, he was prevented from making a competitive appearance for Charlton, although he maintained his healthy scoring record for the reserve-team. He made his debut for Charlton against Swindon Town in the League Cup in August 2007.

In the first half of the 2007–08 season, Dickson went out on loan to two League One clubs. First he joined Crewe Alexandra but failed to score in three games. Crewe declined an option to renew his loan, and he joined Gillingham on loan in September 2007. His time at Priestfield was far more productive, totalling 11 goals in 14 games, including a hat-trick on his full debut against Luton Town. This goal haul was sufficient to make him Gillingham's top scorer that season, even though he was recalled to The Valley in December 2007.

He scored his first goal for Charlton in an FA Cup third Round replay against West Bromwich Albion, but shortly after was ruled out for the rest of the season due to injury. He signed a new two-year deal with Charlton in August 2008.
Dickson began a three-month loan spell at Bristol Rovers by scoring twice in a 3–1 win away at Brentford on 19 September 2009, and went on to play 14 league matches for them. He returned to Gillingham for a second loan spell, also of three months, in February 2010.
After an unsuccessful trial at League Two side Stevenage, Dickson joined Nea Salamis Famagusta FC on a two-year contract.

After winning the Cypriot First Division and finishing as a runner up in the Cypriot Cup with AEL Limassol, for whom he also scored in the Europa League against Marseille, and Shanghai Dongya, Dickson joined League Two side Dagenham & Redbridge on a free transfer, leaving in 2014. He subsequently spent 3 seasons playing in Cyprus, taking in spells at Pafos, Enosis Neon Paralimni and Ermis Aradippou. In the summer of 2016, Dickson returned to England, signing for National League side Sutton United. He made his full league debut in a 4–0 away defeat to Chester on 27 August. On 9 December, Dickson was released by Sutton United having made nine full and 11 substitute appearances in the league, as well as two substitute appearances in the FA Cup, without scoring a goal.

Dickson signed for National League South side Chelmsford City on 6 January 2017. He made his debut after coming on as a substitution against Whitehawk and scored his first goals for the club when he scored twice against Hemel Hempstead Town. One week later Dickson went on to score 4 goals against Eastbourne Borough.

Dickon joined Hampton & Richmond Borough in July 2018, before moving on to Hornchurch a year later.

On 21 November 2020, Dickson joined Dartford on dual registration terms and - on the same day - scored two goals on his debut against Slough Town.

Dickson briefly returned to Erith & Belvedere; the club where he started his career.

On 26 October 2021, Dickson joined Cray Wanderers.

On 30 July 2022, Dickson joined Billericay Town.

On 30 December 2022, Dickson joined Brentwood Town on a one-month loan deal.

On 3 February 2023, Dickson rejoined Hornchurch .

International career
Dickson was eligible to play internationally for England, Jamaica or Ghana as a result of his place of birth and nationality of his mother and father respectively. He was selected as part of Ghana's initial 40-man squad ahead of the African Cup of Nations in 2008, but failed to make the final squad. He made his debut for the Black Stars in August 2008.

Career statistics

Club

International

Honours
Ael Limassol
2011–12 Cypriot First Division
Hornchurch
FA Trophy: 2020–21

References

External links
Chris Dickson player profile at cafc.co.uk
Chris Dickson player profile at crewealex.net

1984 births
Living people
English footballers
Citizens of Ghana through descent
Ghanaian footballers
English sportspeople of Ghanaian descent
English people of Jamaican descent
Ghanaian people of Jamaican descent
Association football forwards
Dulwich Hamlet F.C. players
Charlton Athletic F.C. players
Crewe Alexandra F.C. players
Gillingham F.C. players
Bristol Rovers F.C. players
English Football League players
Erith & Belvedere F.C. players
Nea Salamis Famagusta FC players
AEL Limassol players
Shanghai Port F.C. players
Dagenham & Redbridge F.C. players
Expatriate footballers in Cyprus
Expatriate footballers in China
Ghanaian expatriate sportspeople in China
Black British sportsmen
Footballers from the London Borough of Southwark
People from East Dulwich
Pafos FC players
Enosis Neon Paralimni FC players
Ermis Aradippou FC players
Cypriot First Division players
Cypriot Second Division players
Chinese Super League players
National League (English football) players
Isthmian League players
Sutton United F.C. players
Chelmsford City F.C. players
Hornchurch F.C. players
Hampton & Richmond Borough F.C. players
Dartford F.C. players
Cray Wanderers F.C. players
Billericay Town F.C. players
Brentwood Town F.C. players 
Ghana international footballers